The 2017 Campeonato Amazonense is the 101st season of Amazonas' top football league. Nacional-AM and Rio Negro-AM were deducted 20 and 7 points, respectively, but this was later overruled. 
Manaus won for the first time after defeating Nacional-AM 2–1 on aggregate.

Format
Tournament
All eight teams play each other twice, for a total of fourteen games.
The top four teams move on to the semi finals. They are paired according to their record:
1 vs. 4
2 vs. 3
The results are decided on aggregate over two legs.
The better teams host the second leg.
The best two teams go on to the final, decided over two legs, played at a neutral venue.
Qualification
The top two teams not already playing in Série A, Série B, or Série C, or already assured qualification to Série D qualify for the 2018 Campeonato Brasileiro Série D
The winner and runner-up qualify for the 2018 Copa do Brasil.
The top three teams qualify for the 2018 Copa Verde.

Teams

Regular season

Final Rounds

Semi-finals

Nacional-AM win 4–2 on Aggregate

Manaus win 4–2 on Aggregate

Third-place match

Final

Manaus win 2–1 on Aggregate

Manaus and Nacional-AM qualify for the 2018 Campeonato Brasileiro Série D.Manaus and Nacional-AM qualify for the 2018 Copa Do Brasil.Manaus, Nacional-AM, and Fast Clube qualify for the 2018 Copa Verde.

References

2017 in Brazilian football
Campeonato Amazonense